Tropidophora carinata is a species of land snail with a gill and an operculum, a terrestrial gastropod mollusk in the family Pomatiidae.

This species was found in Mauritius and Réunion, but it may now be extinct.

References

Tropidophora
Molluscs of Mauritius
Molluscs of Réunion
Gastropods described in 1780
Extinct animals of Mauritius
Taxonomy articles created by Polbot